John Richard Smith (26 July 1898–1986) was an English footballer who played in the Football League for Aberdare Athletic, Bristol City, Fulham, Plymouth Argyle and Wrexham.

References

1898 births
1986 deaths
English footballers
Association football forwards
English Football League players
Bristol City F.C. players
Plymouth Argyle F.C. players
Aberdare Athletic F.C. players
Fulham F.C. players
Guildford City F.C. players
Rochdale A.F.C. players
Caernarvon Athletic F.C. players
Wrexham A.F.C. players
Burton Town F.C. players